Nizatidine is a histamine H2 receptor antagonist that inhibits stomach acid production, and is commonly used in the treatment of peptic ulcer disease and gastroesophageal reflux disease.

It was patented in 1980 and approved for medical use in 1988. It was developed by Eli Lilly. Brand names include Tazac and Axid.

Medical use

Nizatidine is used to treat duodenal ulcers, gastric ulcers, and gastroesophageal reflux disease (GERD/GORD), and to prevent stress ulcers.

Adverse effects
Side effects are uncommon, usually minor, and include diarrhea, constipation, fatigue, drowsiness, headache, and muscle aches.

History and development
Nizatidine was developed by Eli Lilly, and was first marketed in 1988. It is considered to be equipotent with ranitidine and differs by the substitution of a thiazole ring in place of the furan ring in ranitidine. In September 2000, Eli Lilly announced they would sell the sales and marketing rights for Axid to Reliant Pharmaceuticals. Subsequently, Reliant developed the oral solution of Axid, marketing this in 2004, after gaining approval from the U.S. Food and Drug Administration (FDA). However, a year later, they sold rights of the Axid Oral Solution (including the issued patent protecting the product) to Braintree Laboratories.

Nizatidine proved to be the last new histamine H2 receptor antagonist introduced prior to the advent of proton pump inhibitors.

Axid (nizatidine) drug recalled due to presence of NDMA.

See also 
 Famotidine (Pepcid) — another popular H2 receptor antagonist

References

External links 
 

Eli Lilly and Company brands
H2 receptor antagonists
Nitroethenes
Thiazoles
Thioethers